= Minnesota Society of Certified Public Accountants =

Professional organization

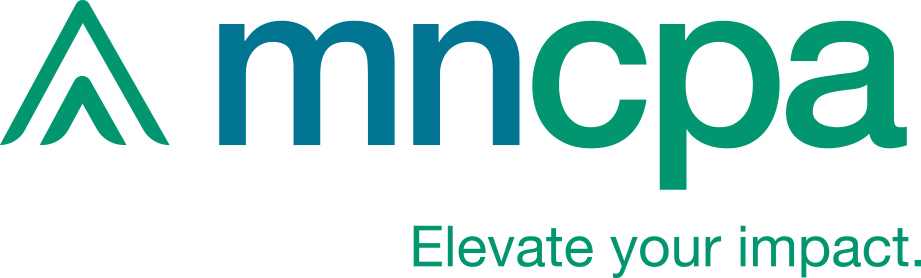
- Abbreviation: MNCPA
- Formation: July 14, 1904
- Type: Professional association
- Headquarters: 1650 W. 82nd St. Suite 600, Bloomington, Minnesota, U.S.
- President: Linda Wedul
- Website: www.mncpa.org

The Minnesota Society of Certified Public Accountants (MNCPA) is a professional association for certified public accountants (CPAs) in Minnesota.

A group of accountants founded the MNCPA in 1904 with the purpose of elevating the profession and supporting the passage of Minnesota's Certified Public Accountant law in 1909.

Today, the MNCPA has more than 8,000 members.

== History ==
The MNCPA incorporated on July 14, 1904, with seven charter members. The organization originally incorporated under the name "Minnesota Society of Public Accountants." The society adopted its current name in 1928 after merging with another organization for CPAs in Minnesota, the "Minnesota State Society of Certified Public Accountants."

Minnesota was the 19th state to organize a CPA society, seven years after New York created the first CPA society in 1897.

== Governance ==
The MNCPA is governed by a 16-person board, annually elected by the membership. Leadership includes the board chair and the MNCPA president.

A staff of 30 oversees the daily operations of the organization at the MNCPA office in Bloomington, Minnesota.

Members can volunteer to join MNCPA committees or task forces, which are designed to provide member input on programs, events or services. Such committees include conference task forces, legislative groups and ethics committees.
